The 2003 WNBA season was the fourth for the Seattle Storm. The team almost made the playoffs, but they fell in a tiebreaker to the Minnesota Lynx.

Offseason

Dispersal Draft

WNBA Draft

Regular season

Season standings

Season schedule

Player stats

References

Seattle Storm seasons
Seattle
2003 in sports in Washington (state)